Harvey Withers (born 26 October 1965) is a British author and military antiques dealer. He specialises in producing reference books on antique swords and edged weapons.

Books
Books written by Harvey Withers include:
 British Military Swords 1786–1912 The Regulation Patterns, An Illustrated Price Guide for Collectors (2003)
The Illustrated Encyclopedia of Swords and Sabres (2009)
An Illustrated Price Guide for Collectors (2006)
The Scottish Sword 1600–1945 (2009)
The Illustrated Encyclopedia of Swords and Sabres (2009)
The Pictorial History of the Sword (2010)
The Illustrated Encyclopedia of Knives, Swords, Spears and Daggers (2011) (co-authored with Tobias Capwell
The British Sword 1600–1700 An Illustrated History – Volume One (2011)

Biography
Harvey Withers was born in Birmingham, England and attended St Edmund Campion Secondary School, Erdington and completed an honours degree in Literature and History at Staffordshire University, graduating in 1987. Since then he has worked as a copywriter and gallery owner.  He is also a full-time dealer in antique swords and edged weapons.

References

Bibliography

 British Military Swords 1786–1912: The Regulation Patterns.  An Illustrated Price Guide for Collectors (2003) (Harvey Withers Military Publishing) 
 World Swords 1400–1945: An Illustrated Price Guide for Collectors (2006) (Studio Jupiter Military Publishing) 
 The Scottish Sword 1600–1945: An Illustrated History (2009) (Paladin Press) 
 The Illustrated Encyclopedia of Swords and Sabres (2009) (Anness Publishing) 
 The Pictorial History of the Sword (2010) (Anness Publishing) 
 The Illustrated Encyclopedia of Knives, Swords, Spears and Daggers (2011) (with Tobias Capwell) 
 The Sword in Britain 1600–1700: An Illustrated History – Volume One (2011) (Harvey Withers Military Publishing)

External links
militariahub.com
harveywithers.co.uk

1965 births
Living people
Antiques experts
21st-century British non-fiction writers
Writers from Birmingham, West Midlands
21st-century English male writers
British male non-fiction writers